Lieutenant-General Vyvyan Vavasour Pope CBE DSO MC & Bar (30 September 1891 – 5 October 1941) was a senior British Army officer who was prominent in developing ideas about the use of armour in battle in the interwar years, and who briefly commanded XXX Corps during the Second World War, before he died in an air crash.

Early life and education
Vyvyan Pope was born on 30 September 1891 in London, the son of James Pope, a civil servant, and his wife Blanche Holmwood (née Langdale) Pope. He was educated at Ascham St Vincent's School, an all-boys preparatory school in Eastbourne, Sussex, and then at Lancing College, an all-boys boarding private school in Lancing, Sussex. He was at Lancing from September 1906 to December 1910, and was a member of the school's football team and its Officer Training Corps (where he reached the rank of sergeant). He was a member of Seconds House and he served as house captain in 1910.

Military career

Early military career
On 8 March 1911, Pope was commissioned as a second lieutenant (on probation) in the 4th Battalion, Prince of Wales's (North Staffordshire Regiment), as part of the Special Reserve of the British Army. The Special Reserve were volunteer reservists (i.e. part-time soldiers) who had not previously served in the military. His commission and rank were confirmed on 24 October 1911. In October 1912, he sat and passed the Competitive Examination of Officers of the Special Reserve, Militia, and Territorial Forces.

Pope was now eligible to transfer from the reserves to the regular army, and made the move on 4 December 1912. He became the junior subaltern of the 1st Battalion, North Staffordshire Regiment, then serving as part of the 17th Brigade of the 6th Division. During this period, he saw service in Ireland.

First World War

Following the outbreak of the First World War in August 1914 the battalion was transferred to England, and embarked for the Western Front the following month. Pope remained with the battalion for most of the war, seeing action in the First Battle of Ypres in late 1914, in the Battle of Neuve Chapelle (where he won the Military Cross/MC) in 1915, in the two serious gas attacks at Wulverghem in April and June 1916 (in the first of which his actions won him the Distinguished Service Order/DSO), in the Battle of the Somme in mid-1916, and in the Battle of Messines in mid-1917. His MC citation states the following:

The citation for his DSO reads:

He also participated in the Christmas truce of 1914. In June 1917, having returned from being wounded for the second time at Messines, and now a captain with the acting rank of lieutenant-colonel, he took over command of 1/North Staffs just in time to see the battalion, now serving as part of the 72nd Brigade of the 24th Division, take a prominent role in the Battle of Passchendaele (also known as the Third Battle of Ypres).

Second Lieutenant Bernard Martin of D Company, 1st Battalion, North Staffs would later write that, some days before the 31 July 1917 attack on Jehovah and Jordan Trenches near Zandvoorde, Pope had ordered, to the surprise of his officers, that the attacking lines were, "not to charge at the double across No-Man's-Land as in the old tactics, but to walk at a steady pace towards Jehovah". Under orders from High Command, the battalion was able to "charge" only after taking Jordan Trench. Starting the day with an estimated 550 rifles, the battalion lost 50% of their attacking force: 4 officers killed and 7 wounded, 38 other ranks killed and 210 wounded, and 10 missing presumed killed.

On 21 March 1918, the battalion was in front-line trenches near Saint-Quentin when the Germans launched Operation Michael, the opening attack in their Spring Offensive: there were extensive casualties, and, in a highly confused and fluid situation, Pope received a bullet wound in the right elbow. By the time he reached a hospital gas gangrene had set in, and his right arm had to be amputated. Every year thereafter he drank a glass of port on 21 March in memory of his fallen comrades.

Following his discharge from hospital Pope attempted to find a route back into military service, but before he could do so the Armistice with Germany had been signed.

Between the wars
Still anxious to pursue a military career, Pope managed to secure a position in 1919 in the North Russia Relief Force, part of the Allied intervention on the side of the White forces in the Russian Civil War. Having reached Arkhangelsk, he took command of a Slavo-British unit largely made up of prisoners freed from Arkhangelsk prison but the exercise was not a success.

On his return to Britain, and following a brief period of service with the 2nd Battalion, North Staffordshire Regiment in Ireland, he transferred in April 1920 to the Royal Tank Corps (RTC). He promptly returned to Ireland with an armoured car company and saw action in the Irish War of Independence. In 1922 he took command for a short period of the 3rd Armoured Car Company in Egypt, but then again returned to Britain.

He attended the Staff College, Camberley from 1924 to 1925, and served alongside numerous future general officers, most notably Humfrey Gale, Archibald Nye, Ivor Thomas, Willoughby Norrie, Thomas Riddell-Webster, Reade Godwin-Austen, Noel Irwin, Noel Beresford-Peirse, Michael Creagh, Geoffrey Raikes, Thomas Riddell-Webster, Daril Watson and Douglas Graham. In 1926 he was appointed brigade major to the Royal Tank Corps Centre, Bovington, where he was at the centre of emerging ideas about the use of armour in battle. He held a post as a General Staff Officer (GSO) at Southern Command from 1928 to 1930 and at the War Office from 1930 to 1933. and attended the Imperial Defence College in 1934. In 1935, at the time of the Italo-Abyssinian War, he was posted by Brigadier Percy Hobart to Egypt, as Commander of the Royal Tank Corps there, and with a brief to promote the advantages of mechanised forces: the episode taught him valuable lessons about the challenges of operating vehicles in a desert environment.

In June 1936 he was posted to the Directorate of Military Training at the War Office under a former Staff College instructor, Alan Brooke; and in 1938 to the General Staff of Southern Command.

Second World War

On the outbreak of the Second World War in September 1939, Pope was appointed Chief of Staff to II Corps, which had been mobilised at Salisbury under Brooke's command. Pope designed II Corps' badge of a salmon leaping over a stylised "brook", as a play on his commander's name. At the end of September 1939 the corps crossed to France to join the British Expeditionary Force (BEF). Pope went with them, but returned to England in December to take command of the 3rd Armoured Brigade, part of Major-General Roger Evans's 1st Armoured Division. In April 1940, he was appointed Inspector of the Royal Armoured Corps (RAC). He was then posted as Adviser on Armoured Fighting Vehicles (AFV) on General Lord Gort's staff at BEF headquarters in France. He soon contrived to become more closely involved in the fighting and was a prominent commander in the Allied counter-attack at Arras on 21 May, which, although it did not halt the advancing Germans, shook their confidence.

The BEF was forced to retreat and, at the end of May, Pope was evacuated from Dunkirk. He returned to the War Office, where he was appointed Director of Armoured Fighting Vehicles in June 1940. While in this post he played a key role in initiating production of the A22 tank (afterwards known as the Churchill tank).

The Western Desert campaign now assumed a growing importance in strategic thinking, and by the summer of 1941 a major offensive in the desert against the Germans named Operation Crusader was being planned. It was to be fought by the newly created Eighth Army (Lieutenant-General Sir Alan Cunningham), comprising XIII Corps, an infantry corps, and XXX Corps, a predominantly armoured corps. In August 1941 Pope was appointed General Officer Commanding (GOC) of XXX Corps. He flew to Egypt in September and assembled a staff but on 5 October, en route to Cunningham's first conference on the forthcoming battle, his Hudson aircraft ran into trouble on taking off from Heliopolis, crashed in the Mocattam Hills and all on board, including Brigadier Hugh Edward Russell, his Brigadier General Staff, were killed. Pope was succeeded as GOC of XXX Corps by Lieutenant-General Willoughby Norrie, who had been one of his fellow students at the Staff College, Camberley in the mid-1920s. Although a good soldier, Norrie, a cavalryman, lacked Pope's high ability and intellect.

Personal life
Pope married Sybil Moore in 1926.

Notes

References

Bibliography

External links
 Generals of World War II
 Lancing College War Memorial
 Relevant archives held at the Churchill Archives Centre, Cambridge

1891 births
1941 deaths
Graduates of the Royal College of Defence Studies
British Army personnel of the Russian Civil War
British Army personnel of World War I
British Army generals of World War II
British military personnel of the Irish War of Independence
Commanders of the Order of the British Empire
Companions of the Distinguished Service Order
Graduates of the Staff College, Camberley
North Staffordshire Regiment officers
People educated at Lancing College
Recipients of the Military Cross
Royal Tank Regiment officers
Victims of aviation accidents or incidents in Egypt
War Office personnel in World War II
British Army personnel killed in World War II
English amputees
British Army lieutenant generals
Military personnel from London
Participants of the Christmas truce of 1914